"Phir Milenge Chalte Chalte" is a song from the 2008 Indian film Rab Ne Bana Di Jodi rendered by Sonu Nigam. In the movie itself, it appears as a dream sequence item number during another movie. The song reenacts famous scenes from Bollywood films, and is performed by Shahrukh Khan portraying a number of famous vintage Bollywood actors, opposite a series of other actresses who are also portraying vintage actors from the films. In chronological order, Shahrukh Khan plays opposite Kajol, Bipasha Basu, Lara Dutta, Preity Zinta and Rani Mukerji.

The five parts of the song correlate and pay homage to fifty years of Bollywood and some of the biggest actors over the time span. The lyrics themselves are mostly composed of song or film titles from each actor portrayed. The chorus itself has an allusion to a Kishore Kumar movie Nau Do Gyarah with the lyric "हम हैं राही प्यार कि" which is also a famous song in Nau Do Ghyarah.

1950s 
Raj Kapoor is the first actor to be portrayed by Shahrukh Khan, while Kajol portrays Nargis. The two acted in 16 films together.
There are many allusions to his movies throughout this part of the song.
The underlying melody is similar to that of "Awaara Hoon" from the 1951 film Awaara. In the video, the people on the arches are dressed similarly to Raj Kapoor's character in Awaara. The second shot is of a giant bowler hat, again, reiterating the homage to Awaara. Later on umbrellas appear paying tribute to Shree 420.
The first line is "Pyar Hua Ikrar Hua" which is the name of a famous song from Shree 420 and "Jeena Yahan Marna Yahan" from Mera Naam Joker.
The next stanza makes reference to three more movies, Chhalia (1960), Anari (1959), Awaara (1951), and Sangam (1964).
"माना दिल तो है अनारी, ये आवारा ही सही। अरे बोल राधा, बोल संगम होगा की नहीं।"
Chhalia, Anari, Awaara and Sangam are all names of movies.
The melody changes from "Awaara Houn" to "Mera Joota Hai Japani" from Shree 420 at the line above.

1960s 
The song spends two stanzas on the 1960s to pay tribute to big actors of different styles. The first is Dev Anand and the second is Shammi Kapoor.

Dev Anand is the next man to be paid homage and Bipasha Basu portrays Sadhana, dressed in white with red roses in her hair and styled churidar, styled in a 60s fashion. The opening melody is similar to that of "Yeh Dil Na Hota Bechara" from Jewel Thief. The first line of the stanza is "Dil ka Bhanwar Kare Pukar" which is the name of a song from Anand's 1963 movie Tere Ghar Ke Samne.
"Jab Pyar Kisi Se Hota Hai" is the next line, and is the name of a 1961 film.
The third line, "Jiya ohh, Jiya Kuch Boldon" is a line from Jab Pyar Kisi Se Hota Hai'''s title song.
The next stanza starts with the line "Tere Ghar ke Samne Ghar Banaunga", an allusion to the first line of the aforementioned movie's title song.
The last two lines are from the same song "Pal Bhar Ke Liye" from the 1970 movie Johny Mera Naam.

Khan portrays Shammi Kapoor in the third part of the song. His co-star is Lara Dutta who plays Helen, colorfully dressed, with jewels and feathers in a high hair bun.
The underlying tune is "O Haseena Zulfon Wale" from the 1966 movie Teesri Manzil. The set copies that of the song in the movie, and is also the first line of this stanza. Right before the song starts though, the melody changes from "O Haseena" to "Aaja Aaja" from the same movie. The next line is "Chahe Koi Mujhe Junglee Kahe" from the 1961 movie Junglee. The last line is from the film Prince (1969) which is "Badan Pe Sitare" which feature Shammi Kapoor with Vyjayanthimala.

 1970s 
The set of the penultimate stanza is a cartoon version of Aap Ki Kasam's "Jai Jai Shiv Shankar". Rajesh Khanna is the actor and Preity Zinta represents Sharmila Tagore. The opening melody and scene is similar to that of "Mere Sapnon Ki Rani" from Aradhana, in which both Khanna and Tagore acted, hinting at the pairing. This song is later alluded to.
In the first scene, Zinta is reading a book called Amar Prem, which is also the name of a Rajesh Khanna movie.  The first two lines are from "Jai Jai Shiv Shankar".
The third line alludes to his 1985 film Zamana. The next line repeats the name of Mere Jeevan Saathi from 1972. The last line of the first stanza is the name of a song ("Zindagi Ek Safar") from the 1971 movie Andaz. The second stanza holds two more allusions to Amar Prem and again Mere Jevan Saathi and following lines "mere sapno ki raani" lyrics of evergreen song "mere sapno ki rani kab aayegi thu" Aradhana with the lines/song titles "Kuch Toh Log Kahenge" and "O Mere Dil Ke Chain".

 1980s 
Rishi Kapoor is the last actor to be portrayed and Rani Mukerji portrays Neetu Singh. The first melody is "Bachna Ae Haseeno" from Hum Kisise Kum Naheen (1977). The song "Dard-E-Dil" from Karz (1980) starts off the second line and the movie Zamane Ko Dikhana Hai (1981) finishes. Second line, another blatant allusion to Hum Kisise Kum Naheen, sung to the tune of "Ek Haseena Thi" from Karz. The last line, "Yeh vaada raha, o meri chandni," has allusions to the films Yeh Vaada Raha (1982) and Chandni'' (1989).

Notes 

Hindi film songs
2008 singles
Sonu Nigam songs
2008 songs
Cultural depictions of Rajesh Khanna